Justice Bean may refer to:

Henry J. Bean (1853–1941), chief justice of the Oregon Supreme Court
Robert S. Bean (1854–1931), chief justice of the Oregon Supreme Court